This article describes Kripke structures as used in model checking. For a more general description, see Kripke semantics.

A Kripke structure is a variation of the transition system, originally proposed by Saul Kripke, used in model checking to represent the behavior of a system.
It consists of a graph whose nodes represent the reachable states of the system and whose edges represent state transitions, together with a labelling function which maps each node to a set of properties that hold in the corresponding state. Temporal logics are traditionally interpreted in terms of Kripke structures.

Formal definition
Let  be a set of atomic propositions, i.e. boolean expressions over variables, constants and predicate symbols.
 a finite set of states .
 a set of initial states .
 a transition relation  such that  is left-total, i.e.,  such that .
 a labeling (or interpretation) function .

Since  is left-total, it is always possible to construct an infinite path through the Kripke structure. A deadlock state can be modeled by a single outgoing edge back to itself.

A path of the structure  is a sequence of states  such that for each ,   holds. 
The word on the path  is a sequence of sets of the atomic propositions 
,
which is an ω-word over alphabet .

With this definition, a Kripke structure (say, having only one initial state  may be identified with a Moore machine with a singleton input alphabet, and with the output function being its labeling function.

Example

Let the set of atomic propositions .
 and  can model arbitrary boolean properties of the system that the Kripke structure is 
modelling.

The figure at right illustrates a Kripke structure ,
where
 .
 .
 .
 .

 can produce execution words belonging to the language .

Relation to other notions
In this approach, the binary relation obtained by abstracting away the action labels is called a state graph.

Clarke et al. redefine a Kripke structure as a set of transitions (instead of just one), which is equivalent to the labeled transitions above, when they define the semantics of modal μ-calculus.

See also

Temporal logic
Model checking
Kripke semantics
Linear temporal logic
Computation tree logic

References

Model checking
Temporal logic
Transition systems